The 2014 OFC U-20 Championship was the 20th edition of the biennial international youth football tournament organized by the Oceania Football Confederation (OFC) for players aged 19 and below (despite the name remaining as U-20 Championship). The tournament was held in Fiji from 23 to 31 May 2014.

Despite the name remaining as U-20 Championship, the age limit was reduced by a year to 19 years of age. So players who want to participate in the tournament needed to be born on or after 1 January 1995. At an OFC Executive Committee meeting held at its Auckland headquarters in November 2013 the competition format was modified. The competition was brought forward a year and the age limit was lowered to 19 years of age. The changes were made in order to allow the winner of the competition plenty of time for preparation and player development for up-and-coming World Cups at Under 20 level.

Hosts Fiji won the tournament and qualified for the 2015 FIFA U-20 World Cup in New Zealand. New Zealand, who were the title holders but did not play, automatically qualified for the 2015 FIFA U-20 World Cup as hosts, so two teams represented the OFC in the 2015 FIFA U-20 World Cup.

Participating teams
Six teams participated in the tournament.

Participants

 (hosts)

Did not participate

 (already qualified for FIFA U-20 World Cup)

Squads

Officials
Seven referees and eight assistant referees were named for the tournament.

Referees
 Robinson Banga
 Bruce George
 Ravinesh Behairi
 Averii Jacques
 Albert Maru
 Nelson Sogo
 George Time

Assistant Referees
 Roger Adams
 Paul Ahupu
 Jeremy Garae
 Folio Moeaki
 Sione Teu
 Avinesh Narayan
 Johnny Erick Niabo
 Terry Piri

Venues

Group stage
The group stage fixtures were announced on 7 May 2014, with the games scheduled as a round-robin tournament.

Awards
The Golden Ball Award is awarded to the most outstanding player of the tournament. The Golden Glove Award is awarded to the best goalkeeper of the tournament. The Golden Boot Award is awarded to the top scorer of the tournament. The Fair Play Award is awarded to the team with the best disciplinary record at the tournament.

Goalscorers
5 goals
 Atkin Kaua

4 goals

 Valentin Nyikeine
 Raphael Oiremon
 Kersom Kalsong

3 goals
 Joseph Athale

2 goals

 Nickel Chand
 Jale Dreloa
 Samuela Nabenia
 Antonio Tuivuna
 Saula Waqa
 Marion Waru
 Papalau Awele
 Bong Kalo
 Tony Kaltak

1 goals

 Sinisa Tua
 Praneel Naidu
 Al-taaf Sahib
 Mataiasi Toma
 Theo Jalabert
 Frederic Nemia
 Jim Ouka
 Josue Wathiepel
 Maya Bob
 Frederick Simongi
 Ayrton Yagas
 Timothy Bakale
 Jared Rangosulia
 Kerry Iawak
 Justin Koka
 Alex Saniel

Own goal
 Goshen Dona (scored for Papua New Guinea)

References

External links
OFC U-20 Men's Championship 2014, oceaniafootball.com

2014
2013–14 in OFC football
2014 in Fijian sport
2014 Ofc U-20 Championship
2014 in youth association football